At the 1924 Winter Olympics, two cross-country skiing events were held. The 50 km competition was held on Wednesday, 30 January 1924 and the 18 km competition was held on Saturday, 2 February 1924. The events were also part of the FIS Nordic World Ski Championships as well, which would be combined until the 1980 Winter Olympics.

Medal summary

Medal table

Events

The results of Haug and Grøttumsbråten in the 18 km event should have been disqualified: as entrants of the Nordic combined event, they hadn't entered their names in this event. Tapani Niku wasn't however willing to be awarded the gold medal, though he later received a gold medal from the French Alp Club.

All three medalists in the 50 km also finished in their same positions in the nordic combined event.

Participating nations
Cross-country skiers from the United States only competed in the 18 km event. Fifteen cross-country skiers competed in both events.

A total of 59 cross-country skiers from twelve nations competed at the Chamonix Games:

References

External links
International Olympic Committee results database

 
1924 Winter Olympics
1924 Winter Olympics events
Olympics
Cross-country skiing competitions in France